St. Petersburg–Glavny, is a railway station terminal in Saint Petersburg, Russia. It is a terminus for the Saint Petersburg–Moscow Railway and other lines running from Central and South Russia, Crimea, Siberia and Eastern Ukraine.

History
The oldest preserved station in the city, it was erected in 1844-51 to a design by Konstantin Thon. As Nicholas I of Russia was the reigning monarch and the greatest patron of railway construction in the realm, the station was named Nicholaevsky after him. Rechristened Oktyabrsky to memorialize the October Revolution in 1924, the station was not given its present name until 1930.

Although large "Venetian" windows, two floors of Corinthian columns and a two-storey clocktower at the centre explicitly reference Italian Renaissance architecture, the building incorporates other features from a variety of periods and countries. A twin train station, currently known as the Leningradsky railway station, was built to Thon's design at the other end of the railway, in Moscow.

While Thon's facade remains fundamentally intact to this day, the station was expanded in 1869-79 and 1912. It was completely redeveloped internally in 1950-52 and 1967. A bronze bust of Peter the Great in the main vestibule was unveiled in 1993, replacing a bust of Lenin. The station is served by the Mayakovskaya and Vosstaniya Square stations of the Saint Petersburg Metro, with both stations linked to the station building by an underground corridor.

Services

High-speed rail

Gallery

See also 

 Emperor railway station, Pushkin town

References 

Railway stations in Saint Petersburg
Railway stations in the Russian Empire opened in 1851
Nevsky Prospekt
Neoclassical architecture in Russia
1851 establishments in the Russian Empire
Cultural heritage monuments of federal significance in Saint Petersburg